Mart Poom (born 3 February 1972) is an Estonian football coach and former professional player regarded as one of the greatest Estonian footballers of all time. He is currently the goalkeeping coach of the Estonia national team.

Poom played as a goalkeeper for Lõvid, Sport Tallinn, KuPS, Flora, Wil, Portsmouth, Derby County, Sunderland, Arsenal, and Watford. Poom made his international debut on 3 June 1992 in the Estonia national team's first official match since restoration of independence, a 1–1 draw against Slovenia in a friendly. He made a total of 120 appearances for Estonia and was the team's captain. Poom won the Estonian Footballer of the Year award six times, in 1993, 1994, 1997, 1998, 2000 and 2003, the second most times won, behind only Ragnar Klavan. In November 2003, Poom was named Estonia's Golden Player. He ended his career on 10 June 2009, after a 0–0 draw against Portugal.

Early life
Poom was born in Tallinn and grew up in Mustamäe. He graduated from the Tallinn Secondary School No. 49 with a gold medal and enrolled at the Tallinn University of Technology, but didn't finish his studies, focusing on football.

Club career

Early career
Poom started playing football with Tallinna Lõvid, before moving to Soviet Second League club Sport Tallinn in 1989.

KuPS
In 1992, Poom joined Finnish Veikkausliiga club KuPS. He played only 9 games in Finland, before returning to Estonia.

Flora
Back in Estonia, Poom and signed for Meistriliiga club Flora, the successor of the Lõvid team.

Wil
On 1 August 1993, Poom left Flora and joined Nationalliga B side Wil for a reported transfer fee of £128,000.

Portsmouth
On 4 August 1994, Poom moved to England and signed for First Division side Portsmouth for a reported transfer fee of £170,000. He made four league appearances for Portsmouth.

Flora (loan)
In 1995, Poom joined his former club Flora on loan, where he broke the club record by keeping a clean sheet for 756 minutes.

Derby County
On 26 March 1997, Poom joined Derby County for a reported transfer fee of £595,000, following a strong performance for Estonia (a 0–0 draw against Scotland, in a rearranged match played in Monaco). He made his debut in the Premier League on 5 April 1997, against Manchester United in Derby's 3–2 away win at Old Trafford, becoming the first player from Estonia to play in the PL. Poom soon became a fan favourite, with supporters often confusing unfamiliar commentators with a low chant of 'Pooooom' before games, which sounded like booing. Poom was named Derby County's Player of the Year in the 1999–2000 season and in 2022, the best footballer of the 2000s decade by Derby County

Sunderland
On 18 November 2002, following Derby County's relegation to the First Division in the 2001–02 season, Poom joined Sunderland on loan. The move was made permanent on 10 January 2003, for a fee of £3.19 million. On 20 September 2003, he headed a 90th-minute equaliser for Sunderland against Derby County at Pride Park. This was described as "the best goal ever scored by a goalkeeper in the 90th minute on his first match against his former club" by the commentator. The goal was cheered by both sets of fans. Poom's career in Sunderland was beset by several injuries, and he was forced to spend much of the 2004–05 season on the sidelines, making 11 league appearances as Sunderland won the 2004–05 Football League Championship.

Arsenal

On 31 August 2005, Poom was signed by Arsenal on loan as temporary cover for Jens Lehmann and Manuel Almunia. The move was made permanent on 23 January 2006. He was Arsenal's third-choice keeper, and did not play a single match in the 2005–06 season. However, he became the first Estonian to receive a Champions League runners-up medal after Arsenal lost to Barcelona in the 2006 UEFA Champions League Final. Poom did not play nor did he make the substitutes' bench for the final, but was in Arsenal's 25-man European squad, each of whom won a silver medal.

He made his debut for Arsenal on 8 November 2006 in a League Cup match against Everton, replacing the injured Manuel Almunia at half-time. Arsenal won the match 1–0 from an Emmanuel Adebayor goal. His first and only appearance for Arsenal in the Premier League, came on the last day of the 2006–07 season, against his former club, Portsmouth, in a 0–0 draw.

Watford
On 26 May 2007, Poom signed for Watford, who had recently been relegated from the Premier League, for an undisclosed fee. He started the new season as Watford's first choice, but went on to lose his place to Richard Lee.

Poom returned to the side for the start of the 2008–09 season, but sustained a dislocated shoulder in a game against Reading on 20 September 2008 that ruled him out for the majority of the season. Although he returned to training before the end of the season, he was not considered for the first-team squad and he was released from his contract, which was due to end in June, on 30 April 2009.

International career
Poom made his international debut for the Estonia national team on 3 June 1992, in a historic 1–1 friendly draw against Slovenia. The match was Estonia's first official match since restoration of independence and Slovenia's first match ever. In November 2003, the Estonian Football Association named Poom Estonia's greatest player of the last 50 years. Poom ended his international career with a testimonial match on 10 June 2009, after a 0–0 friendly draw against Portugal in Tallinn. He made 120 appearances, keeping a clean sheet in 31 matches.

Personal life
Poom and his wife, Lissel, have three sons: Markus, Andreas and Patrick. Markus is also a footballer, while Andreas is a music artist.

Career statistics

Club

International

Honours
Sunderland
 Football League Championship: 2004–05

Arsenal
 UEFA Champions League runner-up: 2005–06
 Football League Cup runner-up: 2006–07

Individual
 Estonian Footballer of the Year: 1993, 1994, 1997, 1998, 2000, 2003
 Derby County F.C. Player of the Year: 1999–2000
 UEFA Jubilee Awards – Greatest Estonian Footballer of the last 50 Years (Golden Player): 2003
  Order of the White Star, 4th Class

See also
List of men's footballers with 100 or more international caps

References

External links

Watford official profile
Arsenal official profile
Mart Poom on The North Stand
YouTube Video of Mart Poom's equalising header
UEFA.com – Golden Player of Estonia
Poominator

1972 births
Living people
Footballers from Tallinn
Estonian footballers
Association football goalkeepers
UEFA Golden Players
Soviet footballers
Kuopion Palloseura players
FC Flora players
Meistriliiga players
FC Wil players
Portsmouth F.C. players
Derby County F.C. players
Sunderland A.F.C. players
Arsenal F.C. players
Watford F.C. players
Veikkausliiga players
English Football League players
Premier League players
Estonia international footballers
FIFA Century Club
Estonian expatriate footballers
Expatriate footballers in Finland
Estonian expatriate sportspeople in Finland
Expatriate footballers in Switzerland
Estonian expatriate sportspeople in Switzerland
Expatriate footballers in England
Estonian expatriate sportspeople in England
Recipients of the Order of the White Star, 4th Class
Association football goalkeeping coaches